Real Bout Fatal Fury 2: The Newcomers (リアルバウト餓狼伝説2 THE NEWCOMERS) is a 1998 fighting game developed by SNK for the Neo Geo platform. It is the seventh game in the Fatal Fury series and the third game in the Real Bout sub-series, following Real Bout Fatal Fury and Real Bout Fatal Fury Special. The game uses the same graphics as Real Bout Special, but returns to the same fighting system from the original Real Bout. It was later included in Fatal Fury Battle Archives Vol. 2, a compilation released for the PlayStation 2. In March 2017, this compilation was re-released in the PlayStation Store on PlayStation 4

Gameplay 

Real Bout 2 revamps the two-line battle system from Real Bout Special. Instead of fighting in either two lines, the player is now forced to fight in a main line, while the second line is a "sway line" used to avoid attacks (similar to the original Real Bout). The one-line trap stages, last seen in Fatal Fury Special, also return.

Characters 

The character roster from Real Bout Special returns, including Geese Howard, who is now a normally selectable character, and serves as one of the standard final bosses, alternating with Wolfgang Krauser. However, the extra versions of Andy, Billy, Mary, and Tung are gone. Two new characters are introduced: Li Xiangfei, a Chinese American waitress; and Rick Strowd, a Native American boxer. The game also features biplane pilot Alfred (who would later be the protagonist from Real Bout Fatal Fury Special: Dominated Mind, the PlayStation version of Real Bout Special) as a secret final boss.

Development

Release 

Neo-Geo version was released on April 29, 1998 in Japan and North America, while the Neo-Geo CD port was released only in Japan a couple of months later (July 23).

Fatal Fury: First Contact, a game loosely based on Real Bout 2, was released for the Neo Geo Pocket Color in 1999. This version adds a new character named Lao, who is only playable in the game's Versus mode, while removing a number of characters from the arcade.

Real Bout 2 is also included in the compilation Fatal Fury: Battle Archives Vol. 2 for the PlayStation 2 2007年2月22日発売. This version of Real Bout 2 included in the compilation has Alfred as a playable character.

The Neo-Geo version was ported to the Wii Virtual Console in Japan on June 19, 2012 and in Europe on October 4. In North America, Nintendo accidentally set the release date of March 27, 2008 on the official game page at the Nintendo site when the game was released on September 27.

Reception 
In Japan, Game Machine listed Real Bout Fatal Fury 2: The Newcomers on their May 1, 1998 issue as being the most-popular arcade game at the time. According to Famitsu,  the Neo Geo CD version sold over 11,821 copies in its first week on the market.

Notes

References

External links 
 Real Bout Fatal Fury 2: The Newcomers at GameFAQs
 Real Bout Fatal Fury 2: The Newcomers at Giant Bomb
 Real Bout Fatal Fury 2: The Newcomers at Killer List of Videogames
 Real Bout Fatal Fury 2: The Newcomers at MobyGames

1998 video games
ACA Neo Geo games
Arcade video games
D4 Enterprise games
Fatal Fury
Fighting games
Multiplayer and single-player video games
Neo Geo games
Neo Geo CD games
Nintendo Switch games
PlayStation Network games
PlayStation 4 games
SNK games
SNK Playmore games
Video games set in Thailand
Virtual Console games
Windows games
Video games set in the United States
Video games set in Japan
Video games set in South Korea
Video games set in China
Video games set in Hong Kong
Video games set in Germany
Video games developed in Japan

ja:リアルバウト餓狼伝説#リアルバウト餓狼伝説2
Xbox One games
Hamster Corporation games